The Scroby Sands Wind Farm is a wind farm located on the Scroby Sands sandbank in the North Sea,  off the coast of Great Yarmouth in eastern England, United Kingdom.  It was commissioned in March 2004 by Powergen Renewables Offshore, a division of E.ON UK. It has a nameplate capacity of 60 megawatts and is able to produce power to supply 41,000 households. Between 2005 and 2010, its capacity factor was between 26 and 32%. Its levelised cost has been estimated at £105/MWh.

The hollow  diameter steel masts that carry the turbines are piled as much as  into the sea bed, to provide stability on a substrate of shifting sands. These shifting sands have piled up and decreased water depth, blocking access from service vessels. An amphibious vehicle is being built to drive on the sand to gain access to the turbines.

The wind turbines were designed and manufactured by a Danish firm, Vestas. Each turbine has a capacity of 2 megawatts. Turbines were installed by the Danish offshore wind farms services provider A2SEA.

Tourism

The wind farm has an information centre serving around 35,000 visitors per year, and has become a local attraction.
In June of 2018, Eon refurbished the property, with new exhibits and interactive displays, among other branding changes.

As of February 2023, the Visitor Centre has been Permanently Closed and vacated by Eon. It was believed to of closed in late 2019, and the reason is unknown.

Gallery

See also

Wind power in the United Kingdom
Sheringham Shoal Offshore Wind Farm
List of offshore wind farms
List of offshore wind farms in the United Kingdom
List of offshore wind farms in the North Sea

References

External links

Capital Grant Scheme for Offshore Wind Annual Report – January 2005 – December 2005 from the Department of Trade and Industry. The main finding being that - apparently owing to a series of bearing failures, and four generator failures - production in the year was less to 30% of the farm's nameplate capacity (albeit this represents production of 90% of the farm's forecast annual output.
Performance report into wind farm from the BBC, based on the above report.
E.ON UK - Scroby Sands E.ON's page about Scroby Sands.

E.ON
Offshore wind farms in the North Sea
Power stations in the East of England
Wind farms in England
Round 1 offshore wind farms
2004 establishments in England
Energy infrastructure completed in 2004